Elva First Album is the debut album by Taiwanese singer Elva Hsiao, released on 17 November 1999 by Virgin Records Taiwan.

Track listing

References

External links

1999 debut albums
Elva Hsiao albums